John Hepburn may refer to:

John Herspolz (died 1485/7), bishop of Dunblane, also known as John Hepburn
John Hepburn (prior) (died after July 1525), Prior of St Andrews and Archbishop-elect of St Andrews
John Hepburn (bishop) (died 1557), Bishop of Brechin
John Hepburn (soldier) (c. 1598–1636), Scottish soldier who fought in wars in continental Europe
John Stuart Hepburn (1800–1860), pioneer squatter in Victoria, Australia